Jordanian may refer to:

 Something of, from, or related to Jordan, a country in the Near East
 Jordanian culture
 Jordanian people, see Demographics of Jordan
 Jordanian cuisine
 Jordanian Arabic
 Royal Jordanian, an airline

See also 
 List of Jordanians
 

Language and nationality disambiguation pages